There have been 98 Formula One drivers from Italy including two World Drivers' Champions. Giuseppe "Nino" Farina was the first ever World Champion and Alberto Ascari was the first double World Champion. All three championships came in the early 1950s and very few Italian drivers have come close since Ascari's 1953 victory. In 1989 and again for the following two years there were 13 drivers from Italy. Antonio Giovinazzi was  the last Italian driver, having competed in F1 from 2019 to 2021. Prior to Giovinazzi, there were five consecutive seasons without an Italian driver, with 2012 marking the first season an Italian driver did not enter a Formula One race weekend and the first season since 1969 that an Italian driver did not start a race.

World champions and race winners
The drivers' title has been won three times for Italy by two drivers both in Italian cars. Giuseppe "Nino" Farina won the inaugural championship in 1950 and Alberto Ascari won back-to-back titles in 1952 and 1953. Mario Andretti won the 1978 title driving for the United States though he was born and raised in Italy.

A total of 15 different Italian drivers have won a race in Formula One, the most recent being Giancarlo Fisichella with Renault at the 2006 Malaysian Grand Prix. Only six drivers from Italy have won more than a single race, Ascari being the most successful with 13 victories.

Current drivers
There are no Italian drivers contracted to compete in the 2023 Formula One World Championship.

Former drivers

Notable former drivers
Giuseppe "Nino" Farina won the very first World Championship race and title in 1950 in an Alfa Romeo. He won half of the six races that year, more than he would win in the remainder of his career in Formula One. Teammate Juan Manuel Fangio took the title in 1951 with Farina only managing to finish fourth in the championship, but he came much closer with Ferrari the following year. However, he was again beaten by a teammate as Alberto Ascari took the 1952 title. His final race victory came in 1953 and he finished third in the title race but would later suffer a career-threatening crash. In 1954 Farina was driving in a sports car race alongside his F1 career. At the start of a race in Monza his car was engulfed in flames and he suffered serious burns that would mean he turned to amphetamines and morphine to cope with the pain. He returned to Formula One for four races in 1955 and, despite finishing on the podium at all three of the ones he started, he felt unable to continue.

Alberto Ascari won the drivers' championship for Ferrari in 1952 and became to first person to retain the title. Across the two seasons he won nine consecutive races, a record still unbeaten 60 years later. Ascari had made his debut with Ferrari in 1950, coming fifth in the championship after contesting just four races. The following year he won two grands prix and was runner-up in the title race. After back-to-back championships with Ferrari in 1952 and 1953 Ascari moved to Lancia but the car was not ready until late in the season leaving him unable to challenge the dominant Juan Manuel Fangio and he ended the year without seeing the chequered flag at a single event. Two races with Lancia in 1955 brought about similar disappointment but Ascari would not manage to see the year out. While testing a Ferrari at Monza he crashed under unexplained circumstances and was killed. He remains the last Italian Formula One Drivers' World Champion and the title holder with the fewest ever grand prix starts (32).

Michele Alboreto started 194 races in a career that spanned 14 seasons. He started with a drive for Tyrrell in 1981, impressing the team enough to secure a three-year contract. He won two races with them before moving to Ferrari for five seasons. It was with the Italian team that Alboreto would come close to winning the title – eight podium finishes including two wins was not quite enough to give him the 1985 championship and he finished as the year as the runner-up. On leaving Ferrari Alboreto's career went downhill with only one podium finish in his final six years.

Four Italian drivers have started more than 200 races, easily more than any other country. Though they had 936 starts between them, the drivers only scored ten victories and 62 other podium finishes.

Giancarlo Fisichella is the most recent Italian driver to win a Formula One Grand Prix having won in 2006. It was his third and final victory and came in his most successful season, one which saw him finish the year fourth in the drivers' championship. Fisichella featured on the podium at 19 of the 229 races he started.

Riccardo Patrese competed in Formula One for 17 years, standing on the podium 31 times including six victories. He started 256 races, placing him as one of the top three most experienced Formula One drivers in history, and finished just under half of them. From his 1977 debut to the end of the 1988 season Patrese was only able to finish at best ninth in the championship, but his career rose to new heights with his second year with Williams. He ended the 1989 season third and crossed the finish line in the top three 17 times across 1991 and 1992, finishing third and second in the championship respectively. He left Formula One after the 1993 season to race touring cars.

Jarno Trulli competed at 256 events over 15 seasons from 1997. He started on pole and then won the 2004 Monaco Grand Prix, but was sacked later that year when his relationship with Renault team boss Flavio Briatore broke down. It would prove to be Trulli's highest championship finish with his accrued 46 points giving him sixth place.

Andrea de Cesaris stood on the podium five times out of 208 race starts, and is the driver with the most starts to never have won a race. He drove twice for Alfa Romeo twice in 1980 before securing a full-time drive with McLaren the following year. Never staying with a team for more than two seasons in a row de Cesaris drove for ten different teams in total. Perhaps his worst time in the sport came between 1985 and 1987 when he only finished six of the 42 races he started.

Elio de Angelis scored two wins during a career that spanned eight seasons. He made his debut in 1979 with Shadow before a six-year stint with Lotus. He achieved his best result in 1984 when four podium finishes helped him to third in the title race. He looked to be going better the following year, leading the championship for several races, but a series of poor results put him down to fifth. He moved over to Brabham for the 1986 season but was only able to compete four times before losing his life while testing at Circuit Paul Ricard. He was the last person to die in a Formula One car until the weekend of the 1994 San Marino Grand Prix.

Alessandro Zanardi won two Indy Car championships but was unable to find success in Formula One. He drove in four races across 1991 and 1992 before securing a full-time drive with Lotus in 1993. He finished five races with a best result of sixth before a crash ended his season early. Zanardi returned the following year but did not win a single point and was unable to secure a drive for 1995. On leaving the sport he embarked on a very successful career in Indy Car before returning for one final, and very poor, season in 1999.

Lella Lombardi is the only woman to have finished a Formula One race in a points-scoring position. She was first entered for the 1974 British Grand Prix with Brabham but failed to qualify, returning to the sport in 1975 with March. She became the first woman to qualify for a race when she secured a place on the grid at the 1975 South African Grand Prix. Later in the year, at the Spanish Grand Prix, she was running in sixth place when the race was stopped due to an accident. With the race not yet halfway through half points were awarded and Lombardi was awarded half a championship point. She was unable to win any further points and neither has any other female driver since.

Driver statistics
Following drivers started at least ten races or won once:

See also
List of Formula One Grand Prix winners

References